Pietro Delli Guanti (born 17 January 2004) is an Italian racing driver currently competing for Race Performance Motorsport in the Formula Regional European Championship.

Career

Karting 
Delli Guanti made his karting debut in 2015. He finished second in the ROK Cup International Final, ahead of now Red Bull Junior Jak Crawford. The Italian won the Italian Championship in 2018 in the ROK Senior class, and competed in the Karting World Championship in the same year.

Lower formulae 
In 2020 Delli Guanti made his car racing debut in the Italian F4 Championship with BVM TECHNORACE . He scored his first win at the final Monza race, however he was unable to finish the season, with Pietro Armanni replacing him for the final round at Vallelunga. Delli Guanti finished twelfth in the drivers' standings, and achieved ninth place in the rookie championship.

Formula Regional European Championship 
The Italian progressed into the Formula Regional European Championship in 2021 with Monolite Racing.

Karting record

Karting career summary

Racing record

Racing career summary 

* Season still in progress.

Complete Italian F4 Championship results 
(key) (Races in bold indicate pole position) (Races in italics indicate fastest lap)

Complete Formula Regional European Championship results 
(key) (Races in bold indicate pole position) (Races in italics indicate fastest lap)

References

External links 

2004 births
Living people
Italian racing drivers
Italian F4 Championship drivers
Formula Regional European Championship drivers
Monolite Racing drivers
BVM Racing drivers
Karting World Championship drivers
Audi Sport drivers